Robert Babcock may refer to:

 Rob Babcock (1953–2019), American basketball executive
 Robert H. Babcock (1931–2014), American historian
 Robert S. Babcock (1915–1985), American politician from Vermont
 Bob Babcock (born 1968), Canadian ice hockey player
 Bob Babcock (baseball) (born 1949), American baseball player